Mohammad Rezaei may also refer to:
 Mohammad Rezaei (wrestler, born 1958), Iranian wrestler who won bronze medal at the 1978 World Wrestling Championships
 Mohammad Rezaei (wrestler, born 1978), Iranian wrestler who won bronze medal at the 2002 Asian Games